Astrology is a pseudoscience which claims to divine information about human affairs and terrestrial events by studying the movements and relative positions of celestial objects.

Astrology may also refer to:

 Astrology (album), by Cage, 2000
 "Astrology", a 2020 song by Bbno$ and Lentra

See also 
 Astronomy, the natural science that studies celestial objects